Mamadi Camara is a Guinean politician who is currently the Minister of Economy and Finance. He is a member of the Majority Rally of the Guinean People Party of former president Alpha Conde.

Publications
 2016: The Keys to Guinea’s development (in English) Editions l’Harmattan, Paris
 2015: Les Clés pour le développement de la Guinée, Editions l’Harmattan, Paris
 2010: "Où va la Guinée? : mémorandum à un ami pour sauver notre pays", Editions l’Harmattan, Paris
 2003: Quarante ans de gestion socialiste et libérale de la monnaie en Guinée (1958-1998) Editions Ganndal, Conakry

References

Government ministers of Guinea
Living people
20th-century Guinean economists
Finance ministers of Guinea
1943 births
Gamal Abdel Nasser University of Conakry alumni
Bocconi University alumni
21st-century Guinean economists